Eddy Bembuana-Keve (born 21 December 1972) is a Congolese former professional footballer who played as a forward. He played in three matches for the DR Congo national team in 1998. He was also named in the DR Congo's squad for the 1998 African Cup of Nations tournament.

References

External links
 
 

1972 births
Living people
Democratic Republic of the Congo footballers
Association football forwards
Democratic Republic of the Congo international footballers
1998 African Cup of Nations players
Championnat National 3 players
Belgian Pro League players
Challenger Pro League players
Serie C players
Levallois SC players
R.C.S. Verviétois players
K.F.C. Lommel S.K. players
R.A.A. Louviéroise players
U.S. Avellino 1912 players
K.F.C. Verbroedering Geel players
Democratic Republic of the Congo expatriate footballers
Democratic Republic of the Congo expatriate sportspeople in France
Expatriate footballers in France
Democratic Republic of the Congo expatriate sportspeople in Belgium
Expatriate footballers in Belgium
Democratic Republic of the Congo expatriate sportspeople in Italy
Expatriate footballers in Italy
Place of birth missing (living people)
21st-century Democratic Republic of the Congo people